Shahaban, Shaban or Shaaban is an Arabic given name and surname. It is also the name of the eighth month (shaban) of the Islamic Calendar, a word indicating "separation" or "dispersion," because the pagan Arabs used to disperse in search of water during this month. Similar names exist in other traditions.

People named Shaban, Sha'ban or Shaaban
People named Shaban, or a variant of that name, include:
Last name
 Ahmed Shaaban (born 1978), Egyptian footballer
 Al-Ashraf Sha'ban, 14th century sultan
 Basil Shaaban (born 1980), Lebanese racing driver
 Bouthaina Shaaban (born 1953), Syrian politician
 Hesham Shaban (born 1980), Libyan footballer
 Mohamed Shaaban (born 1984), Egyptian footballer
 Mostafa Shaban (born 1970), Egyptian actor
 Nagwa Shaaban (1959–2019), Egyptian author
 Omar Chaaban Bugiel (born 1994), Lebanese footballer
 Rami Shaaban (born 1975), Swedish footballer
 Yousuf Shaaban (1931–2021), Egyptian actor

First name
 Shaaban Abdel Rahim (1957–2019), Egyptian singer
 Shaaban Mahmoud (born 1981), Egyptian footballer
 Shaban Bantariza (born 1963), Uganda military
 Shaban Gashi (1939–1990), Yugoslav cinematographer
 Shaban Ismaili (born 1989), Macedonian footballer
 Shaban Jafari (1921–2006), Iranian political figure
 Shaban Nditi (born 1983), Tanzanian footballer
 Shaban Polluzha (1871–1945), Albanian military leader
 Shaban Shefket, Bulgarian footballer
 Šaban Bajramović, (1936–2008) Serbian singer

See also
 Sha'ban (disambiguation)
 Saban (disambiguation)

References

Arabic-language surnames
Arabic masculine given names